The San Diego and Arizona Eastern Railway Company  is a short-line American railroad founded in 1906 as the San Diego and Arizona Railway (SD&A) by sugar magnate, developer, and entrepreneur John D. Spreckels. Dubbed "The Impossible Railroad" by many engineers of its day due to the immense logistical challenges involved, the line was established in part to provide San Diego with a direct rail link to the east by connecting with the Southern Pacific Railroad lines in El Centro, California.

The SD&A's  route originates in San Diego, California, and terminates in El Centro, California.

 Main Line: Runs  from Downtown San Diego south to San Ysidro. Also used by the San Diego Trolley's Blue Line. 
Also used by the San Diego Trolley's Orange Line.
 Desert Line (unused since 2008): Runs  from the Mexico–United States border near Tecate to Plaster City.

SD&AE took over the SD&A's operations in 1933 after financial troubles led Spreckels' descendants to sell their interests in the railroad to the Southern Pacific. Through the years, natural disasters and vandalism rendered sections of the line unserviceable, and portions of the line have been sold to various interests.

In 1979, the San Diego Metropolitan Transit System (MTS) bought the SD&AE from Southern Pacific to establish the San Diego Trolley, an intra-county light rail passenger line. The remaining track into Imperial County is available for freight service, as part of the sale condition to MTS by Southern Pacific.

As of 2021, the San Diego and Imperial Valley Railroad has exclusive trackage rights on the SD&AE Main Line and La Mesa Branch to move railcars from the end of the BNSF Railway in Downtown San Diego to industrial customers in the San Diego area and the Mexico–United States border at San Ysidro.

Timeline

Early 20th century 
October 24, 1932: Financial problems force Spreckels' heirs to transfer their share of San Diego and Arizona (SD&A) ownership to the Southern Pacific Transportation Company for $2.8 million.
 February 1, 1933: The San Diego and Arizona Eastern Railway is incorporated and assumes all operations of the SD&A.
 1934: Operation of the three gasoline-electric units is discontinued.
 January 11, 1951: The SD&AE ends passenger service after years of declining patronage.

1967: The railroad hauls 46 million ton-miles of revenue freight on its  of line.
 May 20, 1970: The Southern Pacific Railroad (SP) relinquishes its interest in the  Tijuana and Tecate Railway to one of Mexico's national railways, Ferrocarril Sonora Baja California, S.A. de C.V.
 September 10, 1976: Hurricane Kathleen destroys major sections of track and bridges on the Desert Line.
 1978: The Interstate Commerce Commission (ICC) denies SP's request to abandon the railway.
 August 20, 1979: San Diego's Metropolitan Transit Development Board (MTDB) purchases the SD&AE Railway Company in restored condition for $18.1 million (the SP retains ownership to the Plaster City to El Centro segment). The ICC approves operation of freight service by Kyle Railways under contract to MTDB. The MTDB reorganizes the SD&AE as a Nevada nonprofit corporation.

Late 20th century 
January 1980: Washouts caused by desert storms displace parts of the SD&AE Desert Line and S-BC Tijuana y Tecate lines, in both the US and Mexico.
 January 1983: With the Mexico damage repaired, Kyle Railways begins rail shipments between San Diego and Plaster City.
 June 18, 1983: Fire destroys two bridges on the Desert Line.
 March 18, 1984: The MTDB signs agreement with the Texas firm RailTex to provide freight service. The new service operates as the San Diego and Imperial Valley Railroad (SD&IV) with the reporting mark SDIV.
 April 25, 1984: The ICC denies Kyle Railways' request to abandon the railroad.
 August 9, 1984: The ICC approves RailTex's application to operate freight service.
 October 15, 1984: RailTex's San Diego and Imperial Valley Railroad begins freight service from San Diego to El Cajon and San Diego to San Ysidro during nighttime hours when MTS' San Diego Trolley's LRV's are not in operation.
 December 1, 1985: La Mesa-based Pacific Southwest Railway Museum, Association, Inc. (PSRM) reincarnates the San Diego & Arizona Railway (SD&A) and begins vintage  roundtrip passenger excursion Golden State round-trips on the railway in Campo between Campo to Miller Creek and/or Division with steam and diesel vintage trains. The museum maintains equipment and corporate records of both the SD&A/SD&AE Railways.
 August 1, 1986: The SD&IV enters into a multi-year agreement with Mexico's Secretaria de Comunicaciones y Transportes (SCT) to set tariffs and provide freight service into Baja California.
 July 1, 1987: Ferrocarril Sonora-Baja California, S.A. de C.V. and major Mexican railroads merge into a single system, now Ferrocarriles Nacionales de Mexico (FNM)
 October 10, 1987: PSRM is invited by the city of Tecate to run a special train from Campo to Tecate, for the city's fair. The event is a success, and "Ticket to Tecate" excursion trains become regular once or twice a month.
 July 14, 1989: SD&IV begins repairs on the Desert Line as a prelude to the start of freight service to Imperial County.
 August 2, 1996: Southern Pacific (SP) is bought by Union Pacific (UP).
 July 4, 1997: Lakeside based Carrizo Gorge Railway, Inc. (CZRY) is formed to operate and repair the Desert Line.

2000s 
 January 4, 2000: RailTex is acquired by RailAmerica and the railroad's reporting mark is changed to SDIY.
2000: FNM is privatized. Ownership of the Tijuana-Tecate line is transferred to SCT, and is administrated by the state of Baja California through the new Administradora de la Via Corta Tijuana-Tecate. ADMICARGA signs a new contract with SDIY.
 July 1, 2001: ADMICARGA assigns Carrizo Gorge Railway, Inc. (CZRY) as the new railroad operator. After 16 years of operation in Mexico, RailTex's SD&IV retires. CZRY subcontracts the line's operation to Ferrocarriles Peninsulares del Noroeste, S.A. de C.V. (FPN), led by local businessman German Reyes Gil.
 May 15, 2004: With repairs to Tunnels 8 and 16 complete and destroyed bridges rebuilt including the Goat Canyon Trestle, the CZRY officially reopens freight service to Plaster City and the Union Pacific Railroad interchange. Major shipments of sand from the Imperial Valley are used to supply ready-mixed concrete to the San Diego construction markets, and other carloads into Mexico as well, such as lumber and grain.
 April 20, 2005: Tierra Madre Consultants create Tierra Madre Railway which buys a caboose (TMRX 1) and leases it to Tren Turistico del Noroeste, S.A. de C.V., a proposed tourist train operating from Tijuana to Tecate and from Mexicali to Puerto Penasco.
 October 17, 2008: The Carrizo Gorge Railway suspends traffic on the Desert Line between Campo and Plaster City so it can rehabilitate tracks to serve the Port of Ensenada's intermodal terminal, a project of the government of Baja California.
 December 25, 2009: A fire damages Tunnel 3 (Lindero), ending the "Ticket to Tecate" excursions.

2010s 
January 1, 2012: Baja California Railroad, Inc. replaces the Carrizo Gorge Railway as the rail operator as a decision from ADMICARGA on the Tijuana-Tecate segment.
 July 2012: Genesee & Wyoming agrees to purchase RailAmerica, owner of SDIY, for $1.39 billion. The U.S. Surface Transportation Board approves the deal on December 19, 2012.
 August 31, 2012: The Surface Transportation Board approves a Change in Operator Exemption, granting operational control of the 70.01-mile Desert Subdivision to the Pacific Imperial Railroad, Inc. (PIR). CZRY hands over its major operating control. PIR continues to operate jointly with the SD&IV railroad and plans to continue rehabilitation on the Desert Line and operate as a Class III railroad.
 December 2012: PIR signs a 50-year lease to operate freight trains on SD&AE track, ending CZRY's operating rights. Under the lease, PIR must complete certain operating goals and repairs by a specified time and make annual payments to SD&AE of $1 million or 15% of gross revenues, whichever is larger.
 January 2013: Pacific Southwest Railway Museum begins making a new operating agreement with MTS.
 March 3, 2013: PIR verifies a notice of exemption under 49 CFR 1150.31 to change operators of the Desert Line from the SDIY to PIR with the Surface Transportation Board.
 Late March 2013: PIR inspects the Desert Line segment.
 March 27, 2013: PIR submits paperwork to the STDB to establish trackage rights on Union Pacific trackage from Plaster City to Seeley.
 June 9, 2016: Baja California Railroad subleases the Desert Line Railroad, cutting PIR out of most operations and repairs. The sublease terms require a $1 million or 7% of gross revenue annual payment (down from 15% in the previous lease) to MTS. The new lease terms also revised the schedule for line repairs, with a 10-mile stretch from Coyote Wells to Plaster City now slated to open by the end of 2017, with the section from the border to Coyote Wells to be repaired by April 15, 2018, and complete repairs by December 21, 2018.
 October 2016: PIR files for Chapter 11 bankruptcy.
 February 2017: Tunnel 6 has collapsed; boulders and weeds cover some tracks near Goat Canyon Trestle, the San Diego Reader reports.
 October 2017: PIR sells lease to operate freight for 99 years on the desert line to Baja California Railroad. MTS still owns the line and BJRR must pay MTS US$1 million per year for the rights to operate. BJRR has also announced a three-phase plan to rehabilitate the line. Phase 1 will cover the border crossing at Division to Jacumba. Phase two will cover Plaster City to Dos Cabezas. Phase three will be from Jacumba to Dos Cabezas. As of February 2019 no rehabilitation work had begun.
Summer 2020: BJRR stops making its lease payments to MTS.
July 2021: Tunnel 3 (Lindero) fixed, side of mountain removed
November 2021: SD&AE cancels Baja California Railroad lease

See also 

 San Diego and Arizona Railway
 Baja California Railroad
 San Diego and Imperial Valley Railroad
 Carrizo Gorge Railway
 Pacific Imperial Railroad
 San Diego Electric Railway
 San Diego Trolley

References

Further reading

External links 
 Middlebrook Photographs of San Diego & Arizona Railway Locomotives MSS 438. Special Collections & Archives, UC San Diego Library.

California railroads

Non-operating common carrier freight railroads in the United States
Transportation in Imperial County, California
Transportation in San Diego County, California
History of Imperial County, California
History of San Diego
History of San Diego County, California
Mountain Empire (San Diego County)
Former Class I railroads in the United States
American companies established in 1931
Railway companies established in 1931
1931 establishments in California
Predecessors of the Southern Pacific Transportation Company